Lake Arkona was a stage of the lake waters in the Huron-Erie-Ontario basin following the end of the Lake Maumee levels and before the  Lake Whittlesey stages, named for Arkona, Ontario, about  east of Sarnia.

Beaches
The ice sheet had withdrawn north of the "thumb" of Michigan, then advanced southward, raising water levels to the east of the "thumb", but not those to the west.  This created four distinct areas around Lake Arkona:
 In the Saginaw basin, where the Arkona beaches were neither submerged nor modified;
 The area on the "thumb", where the beaches were overridden by the ice and destroyed;
 The Black River valley, where the beaches were submerged but protected from modification; and
 The area, which would be Lake Whittlesey, where the beaches were submerged and modified by storm waves.

Modified beaches

From Spring Hill and Zion to the Ohio state line in southeastern Lenawee County, the three Arkona beaches are faint and hard to trace.  The same character continues throughout Ohio and Pennsylvania and western New York.
Between Spring Hill and the Ohio state line the Arkona beaches do not show the characteristics normal to those in the Saginaw and Black River valleys. The beaches appear as ill-defined gravel or gravelly soil.  In the first belt is the faintest, the second is slightly stronger, and the third is the strongest.

Texture
The most peculiar characteristic of the gravel belts is their stiff clay. The soil of these gravel belts is very stiff and forms clods. They are continuous for miles, maintaining a constant level, and then merge into a single set of ridges in the Black River valley.  Unlike most beaches of sand, the remains of the Arkona beaches are only the base structure, which are heavily impregnated with clay.  Except for their consistent elevation, they would not have been identified as beach remnants.
The Arkona beaches have been heavily modified by wave actions and the emergence of Lake Whittlesey.  Initially, Lake Whittlesey's waves began the process of washing the top portion of the Arkona beaches away.  Then, the depth of the lake grew and water currents along the bottom of the lake moved the larger gravels up slope to become part of the Lake Whittlesey beaches. Then a period of deep quiet water allowed fine clays to leave suspension and be deposited among the remaining gravel.

Distribution
As far south as Lenox the three Arkona gravel belts are distinct. Beyond, there are a few intervals in which only two are discernible. Still farther southwest the first and second ridges draw closer together and the vertical interval between them diminishes until it is often difficult to distinguish the two. The three ridges are distinguishable some distance beyond Britton, where the upper two are of very nearly the same height.
The same occurrence of three beaches was noted in the Saginaw basin between Flushing and Cass City, but west of Flushing only two beaches appear. In the Saginaw basin the Arkona beaches were not submerged, but they were uplifted. The full strength of the Arkona beach ridges near Cass City and Croswell makes it clear that the ice barrier stood at least 25 miles north, enough distance to allow a heavy on shore surf.

Correlatives
Lake Chicago was nearing its maximum at the time of Lake Arkona.  In the Superior basin the ice sheet still covered the entire area. In New York the Finger Lakes had united with Lake Arkona with the exception of possibly the most easterly lakes.
The Lake Arkona water levels were close to the level of the First Lake Saginaw, and when the ice sheet retreated north from Lake Maumee, the merger of Maumee with Saginaw gave rise to Lake Arkona.
Later the Laurentian ice sheet expanded southward to the Port Huron morainic system. This rise in the lake waters caused the obliteration of most of the Arkona beaches as described above. In some places the Arkona beaches stand by the outer border of the Port Huron morainic system.

See also
Proglacial lakes of the Lake Erie Basin

 Lake Maumee
 Lake Arkona
 Lake Wayne
 Lake Warren
 Lake Whittlesey

 Lake Grasmere
 Early Lake Algonquin
 Lake Lundy and Dana
 Early Lake Erie
 Lake Erie

General background
 Proglacial lakes
 List of prehistoric lakes
 Great Lakes

References

Former lakes of North America
Geology of Indiana
Geology of Ohio
Geology of Michigan
Geology of New York (state)
Geology of Pennsylvania
Geological history of the Great Lakes
Proglacial lakes
Lake Erie
Glacial lakes of the United States
Glacial lakes of Canada